Worse Than Dead is the first full length album by American crossover thrash band Iron Reagan. It was released on March 20, 2013 on A389 Recordings. It is the only album to feature Paul Burnette on bass.

Track listing

Personnel
Iron Reagan
Tony Foresta – vocals
Phil Hall – guitar
Paul Burnette (Credited as Dr. Guitar) – bass guitar
Ryan Parrish – drums

Production
Produced by Phil Hall
Mastered by Dan Randall
Artwork by Brent Eyestone

References

External links
Official website

2013 debut albums
Iron Reagan albums